Shozab Raza (Urdu: شوزيب رضا) is Pakistani cricket umpire.

Career 
Raza made his debut as an umpire in 2012 when he supervised a One Day International (ODI) match played between Pakistan and Afghanistan at Sharjah Cricket Association Stadium. He supervised his first Twenty20 International (T20I) in 2012 when he stood in a match played between Pakistan and England at Dubai International Cricket Stadium. He got a contract from Pakistan Cricket Board (PCB) along with Zameer Haider and Ahsan Raza in 2012. He stood in the final of the 2016 Asia Cup.

In January 2018, he was named as one of the seventeen on-field umpires for the 2018 Under-19 Cricket World Cup. In December 2020, he was shortlisted as one of the Umpire of the Year for the 2020 PCB Awards.

See also
 List of One Day International cricket umpires
 List of Twenty20 International cricket umpires

References

External links

1964 births
Living people
Pakistani One Day International cricket umpires
Pakistani Twenty20 International cricket umpires
People from Lahore
Cricketers from Lahore